R.U.L.E. is the sixth studio album by American rapper Ja Rule; it was released on November 9, 2004, by The Inc. and Island Def Jam Music Group. The album debuted at number 7 on the U.S. Billboard 200 chart, selling 165,000 units in its opening week. The album was certified Gold and sold over 658,000 copies in the United States. 
Singles from the album include "Wonderful" featuring R. Kelly and Ashanti; the top 20 song "New York" featuring Jadakiss and Fat Joe, and the song "Caught Up" featuring Lloyd.

The album was also made in a heavily edited version removing profanities, drugs and violent content: it removes the skits "Weed" and "Stripping Game". This version of the album became the most edited album other than his previous album Blood in My Eye (2003).

Critical reception

R.U.L.E. garnered favorable reviews from music critics but some questioned if this was a return to form after the disappointing Blood in My Eye. K.B. Tindal of HipHopDX called the album Ja's best since Rule 3:36 and Pain Is Love, concluding that "The Inc. will always be Murder Inc. no matter what and Ja will always be at the head of the fam so get used to it, he's back." Steve 'Flash' Juon of RapReviews gave a mixed review, stating "[T]his is not an overwhelming strong album lyrically, but it's a pleasant enough one to listen to musically - and from Ja Rule that's enough to get by." Timothy Gunatilaka of Entertainment Weekly found love ballads like "Passion" and "Wonderful" suitable for Ja Rule, concluding that they "suggest he might want to stick to raspy romanticism." AllMusic editor Jason Birchmeier said that the album continued the depletion of Ja's relevance in hip-hop, stating, "And so the downfall goes—tragic, indeed, or not, depending on how affecting you find the pathos at work." Nathan Rabin of The A.V. Club found Ja's reliance on emulating "2Pac's tortured-thug persona" to craft mildly amusing "overwrought melodrama" overlong throughout the record and exacerbated further through "anonymous production, irritating skits, and [the kind of] raspy shower-stall warbling."

Track listing
Credits adapted from the album's liner notes.

Notes
 signifies a co-producer.

Sample credits
"R.U.L.E" - Contains a sample of "They Ain't JE" performed by Jagged Edge.
"Bout My Business" - Contains a sample of "Hogan's Thing" performed by Simon Haseley. 
"New York" - Contains a sample of "100 Guns" performed by Boogie Down Productions.
"Where I'm From" - Contains a sample of "The Boys of Summer" performed by Don Henley.

Charts

Weekly charts

Year-end charts

Certifications

References

2004 albums
Ja Rule albums
Albums produced by Irv Gotti
Albums produced by Chink Santana
Albums produced by Cool & Dre
Def Jam Recordings albums